Lillie is a British television serial made by London Weekend Television for ITV and broadcast from 24 September to 17 December 1978.

This period serial stars Francesca Annis in the title role of Lillie Langtry. She had played the same character in the 1975 ATV serial Edward the Seventh and many of the same writers and directors that were responsible for that series helped to create this one.

Other actors featured include Anton Rodgers as Edward Langtry, Peter Egan as Oscar Wilde, Brian Deacon as Frank Miles, Jennie Linden as Patsy Cornwallis-West, Don Fellows as James Whistler, David Gwillim as Arthur Jones and Annette Crosbie as Henrietta Labouchere. Denis Lill played Bertie  the Prince of Wales, later Edward the VII. He had played Frederick Ponsonby to Timothy West's Edward in the aforementioned Edward the Seventh whereas Crosbie played Queen Victoria in that production.

The series has a total of 13 episodes. It is available on DVD in both the UK and North American markets, and has also been repeated on UKTV Drama.

Cast
Francesca Annis as Lillie Langtry
Anton Rodgers as Edward Langtry 
Denis Lill as Edward VII
Peter Egan as Oscar Wilde
Patrick Holt as Dean Le Breton
Peggy Ann Wood as Mrs Le Breton 
Anthony Head as William Le Breton
John Castle as Prince Louis of Battenberg
Simon Fisher-Turner as Reggie Le Breton
Adam Bareham as Clement Le Breton
Joanna David as Jeanne Marie Langtry Malcolm
David Rintoul as Lieutenant Charles Longley
David Gwillim as Arthur Jones
Catherine Feller as Dominique
Jennie Linden as Patsy Cornwallis-West
Bruce Boa as Joaquin Miller 
Brian Deacon as Frank Miles
Don Fellows as James Abbott McNeill Whistler
Basil Hoskins as John Millais
Sheila Reid as Queen Victoria
Patrick Ryecart as Crown Prince Rudolf
Cheryl Campbell as Sarah Bernhardt
Annette Crosbie as Henrietta Labouchere
Nicholas Jones as Squire Abingdon
Tommy Dugan as Judge Roy Bean

Episodes

External links

Period television series
1978 British television series debuts
1978 British television series endings
1970s British drama television series
ITV television dramas
Television series by ITV Studios
London Weekend Television shows
English-language television shows
Cultural depictions of Edward VII
Cultural depictions of Queen Victoria on film
Cultural depictions of Oscar Wilde
Cultural depictions of Sarah Bernhardt
Cultural depictions of Roy Bean
Cultural depictions of James Abbott McNeill Whistler
Television series set in the 1870s
Television series set in the 1880s
Television series set in the 1890s
Television series set in the 1900s
Television series set in the 1910s
Television series set in the 1920s